Asa Guevara (born 20 December 1995) is a sprinter from Trinidad and Tobago specialising in the 400 metres. He represented his country at the 2018 World Indoor Championships reaching the semifinals. At the 2019 edition of the IAAF World Relays which took place in Yokohoma, Japan, Guevara ran on the third leg as part of the Trinidad and Tobago men's 4x400m relay. The team grabbed gold in what was a world leading time of 3:00:81. 
     After the two- year hiatus from sport due to the Covid-19 pandemic, Guevara finished second at the Trinidad and Tobago NGC National Senior Open Championships 2022 in the 400m in a time of 46.16s and was subsequently selected to run on the men's 4x400m relay squad at the 2022 Commonwealth Games in Birmingham, England. The team eventually won the final in a time of 3:01:29.

International competitions

Personal bests
Outdoor
100 metres – 10.53 (+1.2 m/s, Berkeley 2016)
200 metres – 20.51 (+0.8 m/s, Tucson 2018)
400 metres – 45.26 (Houston 2018)
Indoor
60 metres – 6.84 (Albuquerque 2017)
200 metres – 21.43 (Albuquerque 2017)
400 metres – 46.57 (Albuquerque 2018)

References

1995 births
Living people
Trinidad and Tobago male sprinters
People from Chaguanas
Trinidad and Tobago expatriate sportspeople in the United States
UTEP Miners men's track and field athletes
Academy of Art Urban Knights men's track and field athletes
Commonwealth Games gold medallists for Trinidad and Tobago
Commonwealth Games medallists in athletics
Athletes (track and field) at the 2022 Commonwealth Games
Medallists at the 2022 Commonwealth Games